Wareru (also known as Wagaru; 20 March 1253 – ) was the founder of the Martaban Kingdom, located in present-day Myanmar (Burma). By using both diplomatic and military skills, he successfully carved out a Mon-speaking polity in Lower Burma, during the collapse of the Pagan Empire (Bagan Empire) in the 1280s. Wareru was assassinated in 1307 but his line ruled the kingdom until its fall in the mid-16th century.

Wareru, a commoner, seized the governorship of Martaban (Mottama) in 1285, and after receiving the backing of the Sukhothai Kingdom, he went on to declare independence from Pagan in 1287. In 1295–1296, he and his ally Tarabya, the self-proclaimed king of Pegu (Bago), decisively defeated a major invasion by Pagan. Wareru eliminated Tarabya soon after, and emerged as the sole ruler of three Mon-speaking provinces of Bassein, Pegu and Martaban  1296. With his domain now much enlarged, Wareru sought and received recognition by Yuan China in 1298.

Although he may have been of ethnic Mon or Shan background, Wareru's greatest legacy was the establishment of the only Mon-speaking polity left standing after the 1290s. The success of the kingdom helped foster the emergence of the Mon people as a coherent ethnicity in the 14th and 15th centuries. Furthermore, the legal code he commissioned—the Wareru Dhammathat—is one of the oldest extant dhammathats (legal treatises) of Myanmar, and greatly influenced the legal codes of Burma and Siam down to the 19th century.

Early life
The future king was born Ma Gadu on 20 March 1253 in the village of Tagaw Wun (near present-day Thaton in Mon State), to poor peasants. His ethnic background was Mon, Shan or mixed Mon and Shan. He had a younger brother Ma Gada and a younger sister Hnin U Yaing. They grew up in their native village, located about 100 km north of the provincial capital of Martaban (present-day Mottama in Mon State), then part of the Pagan Empire.

Sukhothai years
When he was about 19,  1272, Gadu took over his father's side business of trading goods with the Siamese kingdom of Sukhothai to the east. He joined a convoy of about 30 merchants, and began traveling to the royal city of Sukhothai. After a short stint, he took a job at the royal elephant stables in Sukhothai, and rose through the ranks to become the Captain of the Stables by the beginning of King Ram Khamhaeng's reign,  1279. Impressed by the commoner, the new king awarded Gadu the title of Saw Di-Dan-Ri (စောဋိဋံရည်), or Saw Li-Lat-She (စောလီလပ်ရှဲ). befitting an officer in his Household Corps.

According to Mon and Thai chronicles, Gadu repaid by eloping with the king's daughter. So when the king was far away on a military expedition in the south, the couple, with a load of gold and silver, and about 270 of their retainers and troops fled to Tagaw Wun. (According to George Cœdès, this was a legend. Michael Aung-Thwin states that the elopement story is probably "a trope" to link the early kings of Martaban and those of Siam, and may not be historical.)

Rise to power

Chief of Donwun (1281–1285)
Back at Tagaw Wun, Gadu with his troops became the chief of the village. Over the next few years, he enlarged the village into a small town named Donwun, and built up defenses around it. (His manpower may have been swelled by Mon-speaking refugees from Haribhunjaya, driven out by Tai king Mangrai.) By 1284/85, the commoner had set his sights on the governorship at Martaban itself. That a small-time chief like him would contemplate such a move is a testament to the rapidly dissipating authority of Pagan. At the time, Pagan's forces were faring badly against the Mongol invaders, and vassal rulers throughout the country had become increasingly restless. At Martaban, Gov. Aleimma himself had begun planning for a rebellion.

Aleimma's rebellion turned out to be Gadu's opening. When the governor asked his vassals for support, Gadu readily obliged, offering his services and his men to the governor as well as a marriage alliance between the governor and his younger sister, with the wedding to be held at Donwun. It was merely a ploy to get the governor out of Martaban. Surprisingly, Aleimma took the bait, and made a fateful trip to Donwun with a contingent of troops. On the night of the wedding, while Aleimma's guards were drunk, Gadu's men killed them, and assassinated the governor. It was  11 January 1285.

Rebel ruler of Martaban (1285–1287)
Gadu went on to seize Martaban. His insurrection was one of several revolts around the country against King Narathihapate of Pagan. The king had already lost the support of his key vassals, including his own sons, who ruled key Lower Burma ports (Prome, Dala and Bassein). Without the full support of his sons, the king did not have enough troops to quell rebellions everywhere. In the south, the king's army never got past Pegu (Bago), which was headed by another warlord Akhamaman, and failed both times to take the town in 1285–86.

Meanwhile, Gadu consolidated his control of the Martaban province. He first rebuilt the fortifications of Martaban, and then conquered Kampalani, (believed to be a small Shan state in present-day Kayin State) whose chief had refused to submit. After Kampalani, all other chiefs fell in line. Gadu was still concerned about Pagan, and sought the backing of his father-in-law. By 1287, a diplomatic mission led by his minister Laik-Gi had successfully secured Ram Khamhaeng's support. The king of Sukhothai acknowledged Gadu as a vassal king, and awarded the royal title of "Chao Fa Rua" ("Lord Fa Rua")) also reported in Mon and Burmese as "Binnya Waru") and Smim Warow.

On 30 January 1287, Gadu declared himself king of Martaban. He held the coronation ceremony  5 April 1287. His royal style later became known in Mon as Wareru. The declaration did not elicit any action by Pagan, which was amidst its death throes. The empire formally fell on 1 July 1287 when the king was assassinated by one of his sons Prince Thihathu of Prome. Two years of interregnum followed.

King of Martaban

Early reign (1287–1293)
In the beginning, Wareru was just one of several petty strongmen that had sprouted across the former empire. His realm covered approximately modern day Mon State and southern Kayin State. To his east was his overlord Sukhothai. To his south lay the Pagan province of Tavoy (Dawei), which too was in revolt. To his north were Pegu, and Dala, ruled by Akhamaman and Prince Kyawswa respectively.

Situated on the upper Tenasserim coast, Martaban was an island of stability during the interregnum. The multi-party war among the sons of the fallen king in Lower Burma never reached Martaban. The closest it came to was in 1287–1288 when Prince Thihathu the patricide laid siege to Pegu. Even when Prince Kyawswa eventually emerged as king of Pagan on 30 May 1289, the new king had no real army, and posed no threat to Pegu or Martaban. Indeed, Wareru's immediate concern was not Kyawswa but Tarabya, who had gained control of both Pegu and Dala and their surrounding districts.

Nevertheless, the peace between the two neighboring strongmen held. Each was focused on consolidating his region. At Martaban,  1290/91, Wareru commissioned a dhammathat (customary law book) to be compiled in Mon, the main language of his nascent kingdom. He appointed a royal commission, which returned with the legal treatise that came to be known as Wareru Dhammathat and Wagaru Dhammathat ("Code of Wareru/Wagaru"). (The compilation was part of a wider regional pattern in which the former lands of the empire as well as its neighboring states produced legal texts modeled after Pagan's, between 1275 and 1317.)

Alliance with Pegu and victory over Pagan (1293–1296)
But Pagan was not completely out of the picture yet. It still claimed its former lands. A truce of sorts between King Kyawswa and his three generals was reached in February 1293. Around the same time,  1293, Wareru and Tarabya entered into an alliance as a precaution against a Pagan invasion. In marriages of state, Tarabya married Wareru's daughter May Hnin Theindya while Wareru married Tarabya's daughter Shin Saw Hla.

Still in 1293, Wareru received assurance from Sukhothai of its continued support. King Ram Khamhaeng even sent a white elephant as a symbol of royal recognition to his son-in-law although this open recognition may have forced Pagan's hand to act. In the dry season of 1295–1296 (also reported as 1293–1294), a sizable Pagan army led by generals Yazathingyan of Mekkhaya and Thihathu of Pinle (not Prince Thihathu of Prome, the patricide) invaded to retake the entire southern coast. The Pagan army captured Dala and laid siege to Pegu. The city was starving when Wareru's troops from Martaban arrived and broke the siege. The combined Martaban–Pegu forces went on to dislodge the Pagan army from Dala, and drive the invaders out of the Irrawaddy delta.

The victory proved decisive. At Pagan, the devastating defeat broke the tenuous truce between Kyawswa and his three brother viceroy-generals. Kyawswa would seek Mongol protection in January 1297, only to be overthrown by the brothers in the following December. The brothers would be preoccupied with the inevitable Mongol reprisal until 1303. In all, neither Pagan nor its successor states would attempt a large scale invasion of the south until 1385.

Break with Pegu (1296)
With Pagan out of the picture, the rivalry between Tarabya and Wareru came back to the fore. The immediate point of contention was the control of the newly won Irrawaddy delta. By late 1296, the relationship had deteriorated to the point of war. The two sides met at the border, and the two lords agreed to fight in single combat on their war elephants. Wareru defeated Tarabya in combat but spared Tarabya's life at the intercession of the monks. He brought Tarabya, Theindya and their two young children to Martaban. But Tarabya was found plotting an attempt on Wareru's life, and was executed.

Consolidation of Mon-speaking regions

Wareru was now king of three Mon-speaking regions of Lower Burma. He had reconstituted a major portion of Pagan's Lower Burma holdings: the Irrawaddy delta (present-day Ayeyarwady Region) in the west to the Pegu province (Yangon Region and southern Bago Region in the middle to the Martaban province (Mon State and southern Kayin State) on the upper Tenasserim coast. But he did not control other former Pagan territories farther south such as Tavoy (Dawei), Mergui (Myeik) and Tenasserim (Taninthayi). If he had designs on the southern territories, he did not act upon them. After all, his overlord Sukhothai itself had designs on the Tenasserim coast. (Wareru's grandnephews Saw O (r. 1311–1323) and Saw Zein (r. 1323–1330) would later occupy the lower Tenasserim coast briefly in the 1320s.)

Wareru's immediate acts were to consolidate his rule across the newly won territories. He appointed his trusted minister Laik-Gi governor of Pegu, and his brother-in-law Min Bala governor of Myaungmya in the Irrawaddy delta. Because he did not have a male heir, his younger brother Gada became the de facto heir.

Recognition by Yuan China (1298)
By 1298, Wareru felt strong enough that he sent a diplomatic mission to Yuan China to receive recognition directly from the Mongol Emperor. It was a bold gesture as his nominal overlord Ram Khamhaeng himself was a Mongol vassal. The Martaban mission passed through Pagan, where they were briefly arrested in March–April. By then, King Kyawswa of Pagan had been deposed by the three generals from Myinsaing. At any rate, the Martaban mission eventually made it to the emperor's court, and received the emperor's recognition in June/July 1298. The Mongols knew that Wareru was then a vassal of Ram Khamhaeng, and recognized Wareru anyway because they did not want a strong state to emerge in Southeast Asia, even of Tais.

Wareru was now a full-fledged king, on par with Ram Khamhaeng. The Sukhothai king may not have liked Wareru's move but he did not challenge the Mongols' decision.

Last years
After receiving Mongol recognition, Wareru reigned for another 8 and a half years. Based on the chronicles' lack of coverage, the years apparently were uneventful. Then in January 1307, the king was assassinated by his two grandsons—the two sons of Tarabya. Despite his having raised them, the boys held a grudge against their grandfather for the father's death. On one Saturday in January 1307, they repeatedly stabbed their unsuspecting grandfather to death. The boys were caught, and executed. The king was only 53. Because he left no male heir, his younger brother Gada succeeded with the title of Hkun Law.

Legacy
Wareru's greatest legacy was the establishment of a Mon-speaking kingdom, which enabled the preservation and continuation of Mon culture. Despite its fragility—after Wareru, the polity devolved into a loose confederation until the 1380s—the Kingdom of Martaban became the only remaining Mon-speaking polity from the 1290s onwards. The older Mon kingdoms of Dvaravati and Haripunjaya (in present-day Thailand) had been subsumed into Tai states of Sukhothai and Lan Na by the end of the 13th century. Wareru's kingdom would not only survive but also thrive to become the wealthiest state of all post-Pagan kingdoms well into the 16th century. The success and longevity of the kingdom aided the emergence of "Mons as a coherent ethnicity" in the 14th and 15th centuries.

His second legacy was the law treatise Wareru Dhammathat (also known as Code of Wareru). The Code was the basic law of the Mon-speaking kingdom until the mid-16th century when it was adopted by the conquering First Toungoo Empire. Translated into Burmese, Pali and Siamese, it became the basic law of the empire. The Code was adapted into the later dhammathats of the successor states of the empire, including Ayutthaya Siam and Restored Toungoo Burma.

Historiography
Various chronicles agree on the general outline of the king's life but tend to differ on the actual dates.

Notes

References

Bibliography
 
 
 
 
 
 
 
 
 
 
 
 
 
 
 
 
 
 
 
 
 

Hanthawaddy dynasty
1253 births
1307 deaths
Burmese people of Mon descent
Burmese people of Shan descent
14th-century Burmese monarchs
13th-century Burmese monarchs